The 1983 Harvard Crimson football team was an American football team that represented Harvard University during the 1983 NCAA Division I-AA football season. Harvard was co-champion of the Ivy League.

In their 13th year under head coach Joe Restic, the Crimson compiled a 6–2–2 record and outscored opponents 188 to 140. Joseph K. Azelby was the team captain.

Harvard's 5–1–1 conference record tied for best in the Ivy League standings. The Crimson outscored Ivy opponents 147 to 88. Harvard defeated its co-champion, Penn, in their head-to-head matchup.

Harvard played its home games at Harvard Stadium in the Allston neighborhood of Boston, Massachusetts.

Schedule

References

Harvard
Harvard Crimson football seasons
Ivy League football champion seasons
Harvard Crimson football
Harvard Crimson football